is a private university in Chūō-ku, Chiba, Japan, established in 1965. Ryoshin Hasegawa was the university's first president.

External links
 

Educational institutions established in 1965
Private universities and colleges in Japan
Universities and colleges in Chiba Prefecture
1965 establishments in Japan